Youth Never Returns is a 2015 Chinese romantic comedy film based by the novel of Megan Tay & directed by Tian Meng and produced by Manfred Wong, starring Hans Zhang and Joe Chen. The film is an adaptation of Gu Wei's novel of the same name, and tells the love story of between two individuals that span across ten years. Principal photography started on August 25, 2014, in Jialing River.

The film premiered in Beijing International Film Festival in April 2015 with wide-release in China on October 23, 2015.

Cast
 Hans Zhang as Wang Hui
 Joe Chen as Zhou Hui
 Wang Xiaokun as Feng Song
 Shi Yanfei as Zhu Ting
 Kuo Tzu-chien
 Chen Yalan
 Liao Juan
 Cao Hanchao
 Jia Shengqiang as Xie Yong
 Liu Ting
 Lin Xiaofan as Hu Feng
 Wang Xun
 Ni Jingyang
 Hua Zhou
 Denny Tan as Director Hu

Music
 还好有你 - Victor Wong 
 夜色 - Various singers
 滚蛋歌 - Hans Zhang

References

External links
 
 
 

2015 films
Films shot in Chongqing
Chinese romantic comedy films
Films based on Chinese novels
2015 romantic comedy films
Chinese teen films
2010s Mandarin-language films